The 2018 European Speed Skating Championships were held between 5 and 7 January 2018 at the Kolomna Speed Skating Center in Kolomna, Russia.

Events
For the first time the European Championship is a single distance championship, with the following distances:
500m
1000m
1500m
3000m (women)
5000m (men)
Mass start
Team sprint 
Team pursuit

Schedule
All times are local (UTC+3).

Medal summary

Medal table

Men's events

Women's events

References 

2018
 
2018 in Russian sport
2018 in speed skating
Sport in Kolomna
International speed skating competitions hosted by Russia
January 2018 sports events in Russia